Bilar can refer to:

 Bilar, Bohol, a municipality in the province of Bohol, Philippines
 Bilär, a village in Republic of Tatarstan, Russia
 Bilars, a medieval Turkic tribe, founders of Bilär
 Elvillar/Bilar, a town and municipality in Basque Country, Spain
 Punta Bilar, northernmost point of Mindanao Island, Surigao City, Philippines
 Bilar, Swedish title of Cars (film)